Fan Yunlong (Chinese: 范云龙; Pinyin: Fàn Yúnlóng; born 15 March 1989) is a Chinese footballer who currently plays for China League One side Guizhou Hengfeng.

Club career
Fan Yunlong started his football career with hometown club Guizhou Zhicheng in 2008 and played in the China League Two with the club for three seasons. He then transferred to China League One side Shanghai East Asia after Guizhou Zhicheng failed to promote in the 2010 season. However, Guizhou Zhicheng bought Shanghai Pudong Zobon F.C.'s League One license on 28 January 2011, Shanghai East Asia agreed to let Fan return to Guizhou Zhicheng after nearly one month's negotiation. Fan scored four goals in 24 appearances in the 2011 season, however, Guizhou finished last place in the league and was relegated back to the third tier after they were beaten by Fujian Smart Hero 6-5 in a penalty shootout in the relegation playoffs. Fan chose to stay in the club for the 2012 season and scored 15 goals in 29 appearances as Guizhou finished first place in the third tier and won promotion back to the second flight.

On 16 January 2013, Fan transferred to Chinese Super League side Guizhou Renhe. 
In December 2015, Fan returned to Guizhou Zhicheng on a one-year loan deal. He made a permanent transfer to Guizhou Zhicheng on 24 December 2016 after the club won promotion to the Chinese Super League. Fan transferred to fellow Super League side Guangzhou R&F on 22 January 2019 after Guizhou relegated to the second tier.

Career statistics 
Statistics accurate as of match played 31 December 2020.

Honours

Club
Guizhou Zhicheng
 China League Two: 2012
Guizhou Renhe
 Chinese FA Cup: 2013
 Chinese FA Super Cup: 2014

References

External links
 

Living people
1989 births
Association football midfielders
Chinese footballers
People from Guiyang
Footballers from Guizhou
Guizhou F.C. players
Shanghai Port F.C. players
Beijing Renhe F.C. players
Guangzhou City F.C. players
Chinese Super League players
China League One players
China League Two players